Manuel (11 November 1531 – 14 April 1537), was the Hereditary Prince of Portugal from 1535 to his death in 1537. He was the fifth child and second son of king John III of Portugal and Catherine of Austria.

In 1535, his father officially designated him as Prince of Portugal, taking the place of his eldest sister Infanta Maria Manuela. However, after his premature death at five years old, his younger brother Infante Filipe became the next Prince of Portugal.

Ancestry

References

House of Aviz
1531 births
1537 deaths
Princes of Portugal
Portuguese infantes
16th-century Portuguese people
Heirs apparent who never acceded
Children of John III of Portugal
Royalty and nobility who died as children